Albert Edward Rose (November 10, 1901 – March 28, 1961) was an American track and field athlete who competed in the 1924 Summer Olympics. He was born in Syracuse, New York. In 1924 he was eliminated in the qualification of the long jump competition and finished ninth overall.

References

External links

1901 births
1961 deaths
Sportspeople from Syracuse, New York
Track and field athletes from New York (state)
American male long jumpers
Olympic track and field athletes of the United States
Athletes (track and field) at the 1924 Summer Olympics